Raul António Águas (born 12 January 1949) is a Portuguese retired football striker and manager.

Playing career
Born in Lobito, Portuguese Angola, Águas started his career having an unsuccessful spell at S.L. Benfica, moving after three years to Académica de Coimbra. He finished his career in 1984 at the age of 35, after stints for U.F.C.I. Tomar, Belgium's KV Mechelen and Lierse SK, Oliveira do Bairro SC, Portimonense S.C. and G.D. Chaves.

Over eight seasons, Águas amassed Primeira Liga totals of 111 matches and 37 goals.

Coaching career
Águas would have a more prominent career as manager, starting with his last club and helping the lowly northerners qualify for the UEFA Cup in 1987 after they finished an all-time best fifth in the league. After his exploits he moved to fellow league side Boavista F.C. early into the 1988–89 campaign.

After a third place with Sporting CP in 1990, being one of three managers during the season, Águas successively managed S.C. Braga, Vitória de Setúbal – four years, two in the second division – F.C. Paços de Ferreira and C.S. Marítimo. In 1995, he joined António Oliveira's staff as the Portugul national team prepared for UEFA Euro 1996, retaining his assistant post under the next coach, former Benfica player and manager Artur Jorge; after the team's failure to qualify for the 1998 FIFA World Cup, the pair was sacked.

Águas then returned to club action with former side Académica, for one year, then spent four years out of professional football, after which he was again assistant to Artur Jorge, now with PFC CSKA Moscow in Russia.

Personal life
Águas' uncle, José Águas, as well as his cousin Rui, played with great success for Benfica and Portugal. The latter also represented FC Porto, winning accolades there as well.

References

External links
 
 
 

1949 births
Living people
Portuguese footballers
Association football forwards
Primeira Liga players
Liga Portugal 2 players
S.L. Benfica footballers
Associação Académica de Coimbra – O.A.F. players
U.F.C.I. Tomar players
Portimonense S.C. players
G.D. Chaves players
Belgian Pro League players
K.V. Mechelen players
Lierse S.K. players
Portugal youth international footballers
Portuguese expatriate footballers
Expatriate footballers in Belgium
Portuguese expatriate sportspeople in Belgium
Portuguese football managers
Primeira Liga managers
Liga Portugal 2 managers
G.D. Chaves managers
Boavista F.C. managers
Sporting CP managers
S.C. Braga managers
Vitória F.C. managers
F.C. Paços de Ferreira managers
C.S. Marítimo managers
Associação Académica de Coimbra – O.A.F. managers
Associação Naval 1º de Maio managers
Portuguese expatriate sportspeople in Russia
People from Benguela Province